Love Island (series 2) may refer to:

 Love Island (2005 TV series, series 2)
 Love Island (2015 TV series, series 2)